San Miguelito is a municipality in the Honduran department of Francisco Morazán.

References 

Municipalities of the Francisco Morazán Department